Slatina is a village in the municipality of Novo Goražde, Bosnia and Herzegovina.

References

Populated places in Novo Goražde